Nebraska's 1st congressional district is a congressional district in the U.S. state of Nebraska that encompasses most of its eastern quarter, except for Omaha and some of its suburbs, which are part of the 2nd congressional district. It includes the state capital Lincoln, as well as the cities of Bellevue, Fremont, and Norfolk. Following the 2010 United States Census, the 1st congressional district was changed to include an eastern section of Sarpy County; Dakota County was moved to the 3rd congressional district.

Under the lines of redistricting following the 2010 census, The Cook Partisan Voting Index (CPVI) for the 1st congressional district was R+11. However, in 2022, the CPVI adjusted the district's rating to R+9, as a result of redistricting.

Recent results in statewide elections

List of members representing the district

Election history

2002

2004

2006

2008

2010

2012

2014

2016

2018

2020

2022 (special)

2022

Historical district boundaries

See also

Nebraska's congressional districts
List of United States congressional districts

References

 Congressional Biographical Directory of the United States 1774–present

01
1883 establishments in Nebraska